Santa Rosa station may refer to the following stations:

Santa Rosa (Barcelona Metro), a metro station in Barcelona, Spain
Santa Rosa station (Lima Metro), a metro station in Lima, Peru
Santa Rosa station (PNR), a railway station in Santa Rosa, Laguna, the Philippines
Santa Rosa station (Carabobo), on the Valencia Metro in Carabobo, Venezuela
Santa Rosa Downtown station, a railway station in Santa Rosa, California, United States
Santa Rosa North station, a railway station in Santa Rosa, California, United States